Sue Hart (or similar) may refer to:
 Su Hart (born 1959), British musician
Susanne Hart (1927–2010), South African conservationist
Susan Hart (born 1941), American actress